Qango were a short-lived progressive rock band, a spin-off from Asia. In 1999, an attempt was made at a partial reunion of the progressive rock supergroup Asia involving John Wetton (bass, vocals), Carl Palmer (drums) and Geoff Downes (keys), with Dave Kilminster to be on guitar. However, Downes withdrew from plans, choosing to stick with John Payne in their Asia line-up. Wetton and Palmer instead formed Qango with Kilminster and John Young on keys (who had briefly replaced Downes in Asia in 1989). The band's live set was based on songs by Asia and Palmer's former band Emerson, Lake & Palmer.

The band did not attract the same commercial interest as an Asia reunion. Two shows were planned for November 1999, but were cancelled as Wetton required a wrist operation. Instead, the band played five UK dates in February 2000 (including a London show on 4 February when Keith Emerson jammed with the band) and six in April 2000. Subsequent touring plans and ideas to record a studio album were abandoned, with Wetton and Palmer soon returning to their solo activities.

Live in the Hood
The band's second show (3 February 2000) was recorded for a live release, Live in the Hood, the band's only official output with one track "The Last One Home" being their only original.

Tracks on Live in the Hood
"Time Again" (Geoff Downes/Steve Howe/John Wetton/Carl Palmer) - Asia
"Sole Survivor" (Downes/Wetton) - Asia
"Bitches Crystal" (Greg Lake/Keith Emerson) - ELP
"Dave Kilminster Solo" (Dave Kilminster)
"All Along the Watchtower" (Bob Dylan)
"The Last One Home" (John Wetton/John Young) 
"John Young Solo" (John Young)
"Hoedown" (Aaron Copland) - ELP
"Fanfare for the Common Man" (Aaron Copland) - ELP
"Heat of the Moment" (Downes/Wetton) - Asia

Personnel 
 John Wetton- bass guitar, lead vocals
 Dave Kilminster- guitars, backing vocals 
 John Young- keyboards, backing vocals
 Carl Palmer- drums

References

External links
Details of Qango's UK Tour

English progressive rock groups
Rock music supergroups
Musical groups established in 1999
Musical groups disestablished in 2000
Spin-offs
1999 establishments in England